The second competition weekend of the 2012–13 ISU Speed Skating World Cup was held at the Kolomna Speed Skating Center in Kolomna, Russia, from Saturday, 24 November, until Sunday, 25 November 2012.

Schedule of events
Schedule of the event:

Medal summary

Men's events

Women's events

Standings
The top ten standings in the contested cups after the weekend.

Men's cups

1500 m

5000/10000 m

Mass start

Women's cups

1500 m

3000/5000 m

Mass start

References

2
Isu World Cup, 2012-13, 2
Sport in Kolomna